Namapoikia rietoogensis is among the earliest known animals to produce a calcareous (probably aragonite) skeleton. 
Known from the Ediacaran period, before the Cambrian explosion of calcifying animals, the long-lived organism grew up to a metre in diameter and resembles a colonial sponge. It was an encruster, filling vertical fissures in the reefs in which it originally grew.

The fossil was first found in the Omkyk Member of the Nama Group from Rietoog in southern Namibia, in association with other calcifying fossils, Cloudina and Namacalathus.

Its mineralogy and accretionary style has been compared with that of the Lophotrochozoans, though its unfamiliar morphology suggests a stem-group or deeper affiliation to this group.

It grew in spurts, first emplacing an organic skeleton, then filling this in with aragonite.

See also 

 Ediacaran biota
 Namacalathus
 Cloudina
 List of Ediacaran genera

References 

Ediacaran life
Enigmatic prehistoric animal genera
Precambrian Africa
Fossils of Namibia
Fossil taxa described in 2002